Sydney James Bidwell (14 January 1917 – 25 May 1997) was a British Labour politician.

Bidwell was a railway worker on the Great Western Railway and became a tutor and organiser for the National Council of Labour Colleges. He went on to become the London Regional Education Officer for the TUC. Having joined the Labour Party in his youth, in the 1940s he was also a member of the Trotskyist Revolutionary Communist Party.  He was a councillor on Southall Borough Council 1951–55.

Bidwell contested East Hertfordshire in 1959 and South West Hertfordshire in 1964. He was elected as Member of Parliament (MP) for Southall at the 1966 general election, and was elected for the largely similar seat of Ealing Southall in 1983.

Whilst in Parliament, he saw through a bill to exclude Sikhs from being forced to wear crash helmets on motorbikes.

Before the 1992 general election, Bidwell was de-selected as a candidate at the age of 75.  When his appeal to the Labour National Executive Committee failed, he decided to stand as a "True Labour" candidate, but finished third behind the official Labour candidate Piara Khabra, with 9% of the vote.

References

Sources

Sydney Bidwell's parliamentary record: from 'Hansard

Account of Bidwell's victory on turban-wearing

External links 
 

1917 births
1997 deaths
Independent politicians in England
Labour Party (UK) MPs for English constituencies
Councillors in Greater London
Revolutionary Communist Party (UK, 1944) members
UK MPs 1966–1970
UK MPs 1970–1974
UK MPs 1974
UK MPs 1974–1979
UK MPs 1979–1983
UK MPs 1983–1987
UK MPs 1987–1992
People from Southall